Pinch or pinching may refer to:
 Pinch (action), to grip an object or substance between two fingers. 
 Pinch (unit), a very small amount of an ingredient, typically salt or a spice
 Pinch (whisky) or Haig's Pinch, brand of Scotch whisky
 Pinch, Indiana, an unincorporated community
 Pinch, West Virginia,  a census-designated place in Kanawha County

Mathematics and science
 Pinch (plasma physics), the compression of a plasma filament by magnetic forces, or a device which uses this effect for magnetic fusion energy
 Pinching is a multi-touch gesture, done by squeezing one's fingers on a touchscreen
 Pinch point (economics), the level of inventory below which consumers become concerned about security of supply
 Pinch point (mathematics), a type of singular point on an algebraic surface
 Pinch analysis, a methodology for minimising energy consumption of chemical processes

Arts and culture
 The Pinch, a literary journal published at University of Memphis
 Pinched, a 1917 film starring Harold Lloyd
 A puppet voiced and operated by Bill Schulz on Red Eye w/Greg Gutfeld
 Tom Pinch and Ruth Pinch, characters in the novel Martin Chuzzlewit by Charles Dickens
 Doctor Pinch, character in The Comedy of Errors by William Shakespeare
 Pinch (film), a 2019 animated short film by Diego Maclean

People
 Pinch (drummer) (born Andrew Pinching, born 1965), drummer for punk band The Damned
 Pinch (dubstep musician) (born Rob Ellis, born 1980), electronic musician who produces dubstep
 Colin Pinch (1921–2006), Australian cricketer
 John Pinch the elder (1769–1827), British architect in Bath
 John Pinch the younger (1796–1849), British architect in Bath
 Trevor Pinch (born 1952), British sociologist at Cornell University
 Frank Pinch (1891–1961), English cricketer
 William Pinch (born 1940), mineralogist from Rochester, New York
 Evelyn Pinching (1915–1988), British alpine skier
 William Wyatt Pinching (1851–1878), rugby union international who represented England in 1872
 Pinch Thomas (1888–1953), backup catcher in Major League Baseball

Sports
 Pinch hitter (baseball), a substitute batter
 Pinch hitter (cricket), a batsman (not a substitute) promoted up the batting order 
 Pinch runner, a baseball player substituted for a player on base

See also 
 John Pinch (disambiguation)
 Pinch point (disambiguation)